Pınargözü Cave (literally "eye of the water"), is a cave  west of the town of Yenişarbademli in Isparta Province, Turkey. It is considered the longest cave in Turkey, although it has not yet been fully explored, and the precise extent to which it has been explored is in dispute. 

It is easily recognized by the stream of water that pours continuously from its mouth, called the Devre Su. A constant wind of up to  blows through the cave's narrow opening due to the chimney effect.

Since its discovery, surveyors have considered the cave extremely difficult to explore, owing to the numerous waterfalls, flooded passages, and traverses within. As a result, it is not included on the list of Turkish caves open to the public. Access is only permitted to approved professionals with appropriate caving gear.

Exploration 
The cave was first discovered in 1964 by the Turkish "father of caves", Temuçin Aygen. His brief foray into the cave with the Speleological Society of Turkey was halted by a sump, or flooded passage, just inside the entrance. A team of French speleologists of the Spéléo-club de Paris working with local Turkish cavers was the first to enter the cave proper. Team members  J. L. Pintaux and Doniat (full names not given) passed through the sump in August 1965 and were the first to explore the cave's interior. In August 1968, Claude Chabert, and Michel Bakalowicz of the Spéléo-club de Paris, accompanied by Michael Clarke of the British Speleological Association, were the second group to venture past the entry sump. The English team returned in August 1969 and pushed forward to about  before stopping.

Clarke returned with the French Alpine Club again in August 1971, this time joined by members of the Speleological Society of Turkey. By this point  of passages had been documented within Pınargözü Cave. In September 1975, the Red Rose Cave & Pothole Club discovered and explored a tributary passage which they called the Affluent sump. A five-person team from the University of Bristol Speleological Society entered the cave immediately following the departure of the Red Rose team. This team free-dove the  sump at the end of the cave, but were unable to progress past an  waterfall. 

Over 100 individual caves had been mapped within it. In August of 1987, 1988, and 1989, a team from the French Federation of Speleology attempted to press further into the cave.

In 2011, the Turkish government launched a project entitled "Kızıldağ Milli Parkı Mağaralarının Araştırılması Projesi", the purpose of which was to catalogue and investigate the caves within the park, particularly Pınargözü Cave. Initially, the project was intended to last until 2014, but due to the extreme difficulty of exploring the cave, the 12-member team was still surveying in 2015. His team had pushed as far as  into the cave. The full extent of Pınargözü Cave has still not been surveyed.

Geology
The karst in that region is Triassic period limestone. Because of limestone's extreme porosity, it is highly susceptible to erosion; karst areas typically have large numbers of caves and chambers, and the Pınargözü Cave is no exception. Estimates for the number of caves in the area vary widely. The Turkey Archaeological Settlements Project (TAY) estimates just over 2,400 caves in the area, while the Turkish Ministry of Culture and Tourism claims there may be over 20,000. Pınargözü Cave is largely laid out horizontally, with numerous vertical chimneys and cascades between horizontal galleries and passages.

Hydrology 
Pınargözü Cave is an active cave, meaning that water flows within it. It is considered an outflow cave, as the water flows out of the cave's mouth from a spring inside. The source of the spring has yet to be located, although there are semi-permanent fields of snow and a large tarn, or glacial lake, on the ground above the cave.

The cave contains a number of water features which make it extremely difficult to explore, such as large waterfalls, ponds, dripstone pools, sumps, and siphons. The flow rate fluctuates with the season, from over 700 litres per second during most of the year to approximately 500–600 litres per second during the slower-flowing summer season. Because of this, summer is the only time when it is possible to explore the cave. The water temperature is around  year-round, which means that divers must wear thick protective clothing when exploring flooded areas of the cave.

Wind 
For comparison, the Beaufort wind force scale classifies any wind greater than 89 km/h as a whole gale, and anything greater than 118 km/h as a hurricane-force wind. This wind is created as a result of the chimney effect, where temperature differences between openings in higher and lower altitudes result in strong gusts of wind coming from the lower entrance.

Citations

References 

 
 
 
 

Caves of Turkey
Karst caves
Limestone caves
Landforms of Isparta Province
Yenişarbademli District